The seventh season of Bachelor in Paradise premiered on August 16, 2021. In June 2021, it was confirmed that David Spade, Lil Jon, Tituss Burgess, Lance Bass and others would serve as rotating guest hosts for the seventh season, replacing original host Chris Harrison.

Production
As with the previous season, filming took place in the town of Sayulita, located in Vallarta-Nayarit, Mexico. It was originally set to film and air in the summer of 2020, but it was delayed due to the COVID-19 pandemic.

Casting
On June 18, 2021, Wells Adams was confirmed to be returning as the bartender with a larger role; he will be master of ceremonies at rose ceremonies and a guest host in selected episodes.

On July 8, 2021, the first 19 contestants were revealed. On July 13, 2021, a further 4 contestants were confirmed. On August 9, 2021, former Bachelorette Becca Kufrin was confirmed to be a contestant. This made her the first former lead to compete in Bachelor In Paradise. On August 12, 2021, Demi Burnett was confirmed to be returning this season.

Contestants

Elimination table

Key
 The contestant is male.
 The contestant is female.
 The contestant went on a date and gave out a rose at the rose ceremony.
 The contestant went on a date and got a rose at the rose ceremony.
 The contestant gave or received a rose at the rose ceremony, thus remaining in the competition.
 The contestant received the last rose.
 The contestant went on a date and received the last rose.
 The contestant went on a date and was eliminated.
 The contestant was eliminated.
 The contestant had a date and voluntarily left the show.
 The contestant voluntarily left the show.
 The couple broke up and were eliminated.
 The couple decided to stay together and won the competition.
 The contestant had to wait before appearing in paradise.
 The couple split, but later got back together.
 The couple left together to pursue a relationship.

Episodes

References

External links
 

The Bachelor (franchise) seasons
2021 American television seasons
Television shows set in Mexico
Television productions postponed due to the COVID-19 pandemic